This is the list of things named after Niels Henrik Abel (1802–1829), a Norwegian mathematician.

Mathematics

 Abel's binomial theorem
 Abel elliptic functions
 Abel equation
 Abel equation of the first kind
 Abel–Goncharov interpolation
 Abel–Plana formula
 Abel function
 Abel's integral equation
 Abel's identity
 Abel's inequality
 Abel's irreducibility theorem
 Abel–Jacobi map
Abel–Jacobi theorem
 Abel polynomials
 Abel's summation formula
Abelian means
 Abel's test
 Abel's theorem
Abelian theorem
 Abel–Ruffini theorem
 Abel transform
 Abel transformation
 Abelian category
Pre-abelian category
Quasi-abelian category
 Abelian group
Abelianization
Metabelian group
Non-abelian group
 Abelian extension
 Abelian integral
 Abelian surface
 Abelian variety
 Abelian variety of CM-type
 Dual abelian variety
 Abelian von Neumann algebra

Geography 
Abeltoppen, a mountain in Dickson Land at Spitsbergen, Svalbard.
 , a street in the 12th arrondissement of Paris in front of the Gare de Lyon mainline station.

Other
Abel, a lunar crater.
Abel Prize

References

Abel
Niels Henrik Abel